Subodh Banerjee (1918 – 16 September 1974) was an Indian politician, belonging to the Socialist Unity Centre of India. He introduced the Gherao principle as a formal mode of protest in the trade union sector of India while being the Labour Minister in the 1967 United Front Government in West Bengal. He was the PWD minister in the 1969 United Front Government of West Bengal. His lasting contribution was the removal of all statutes of "guardians and rulers" of the British Indian empire from public places in Kolkata. However, he appreciated the artistic value of many of them and stored them in some other public places not in the public view. He was called the Gherao minister and was recognised both by his friends and detractors as a 'scrupulously honest minister and a firebrand labour leader with incendiary oratorical skill'.

He was a member of the Central Committee of the SUCI and the first MLA of the party.

He represented the Jaynagar assembly constituency of West Bengal.

References

Further reading
A Homage to Subodh Bannerjee 

Socialist Unity Centre of India (Communist) politicians
Trade unionists from West Bengal
Indian atheists
1918 births
1974 deaths
People from Jaynagar Majilpur
Members of the West Bengal Legislative Assembly